Bring 'Em All In (1995) was Mike Scott's first of two solo albums, the other being 1997's Still Burning.  Dream Harder (1993) was recorded by Scott and session musicians, but was credited to Scott's band, The Waterboys.  The cover and album photography were provided by Niko Bolas, Stefano Giovanni, Jeff Mitchell and Scott.
The song "What Do You Want Me to Do?" was later covered by Rod Stewart.

Track listing
All songs by Mike Scott.

 "Bring 'Em All In" – 3:58 
 "Iona Song" – 2:47 
 "Edinburgh Castle" – 4:37 
 "What Do You Want Me to Do?" – 3:05 
 "I Know She's in the Building" – 3:16 
 "City Full of Ghosts (Dublin)" – 2:47 
 "Wonderful Disguise" – 3:32 
 "Sensitive Children" – 2:40 
 "Learning to Love Him" – 1:39 
 "She Is So Beautiful" – 4:05 
 "Wonderful Disguise (Reprise)" – 0:29 
 "Long Way to the Light" – 6:32 
 "Building the City of Light" – 3:49

Personnel
 Mike Scott
 Roddy Lorimer - Trumpet

Charts

References

External links
Lyrics at mikescottwaterboys.com
Official forum Chord requests are often fulfilled at "Musician's Corner"

1995 debut albums
Mike Scott (musician) albums
Albums produced by Niko Bolas
Chrysalis Records albums